The Cleveland Chamber Symphony (CSS) is an American chamber orchestra based in Cleveland, Ohio.  It is dedicated to the performance of contemporary classical music, and has presented over 200 performance premieres. They work in partnership with Baldwin-Wallace Conservatory of Music.

History
The Cleveland Chamber Symphony was founded in 1980, by composer Edwin London, as a professional ensemble to perform new music, primarily made by American composers. Through Dr. London and a dedicated core of Cleveland musicians, the ensemble steadily grew in scope and stature throughout the following two decades, performing, recording, and commissioning contemporary orchestral music.

At the peak of its activity, the CCS presented a concert series of eight programs and numerous recording sessions under the direction of Edwin London. Performances were offered at Cleveland State University, and many other Cleveland venues, notably the Cleveland Museum of Art, Trinity Cathedral, Public Hall, Karamu House, Liberty Hill Baptist Church, Old Stone Church, and John Carroll University. The ensemble offered "encore" performances in communities adjacent to Cuyahoga County and throughout the Midwest.

Composers in Cleveland and around the world began to see the Cleveland Chamber Symphony as an important resource for their work, as well as that of younger students. Composers of national and international stature, whose works were being commissioned and performed by the CCS were invited as guest conductors and pedagogues. A hallmark of the ensemble was the close collaborative relationship it shared with many composers. To some, the CCS set a new standard for the performance of contemporary orchestral music. A critically acclaimed performance of Bernard Rands' Canti Trilogy led to a national tour culminating in a performance in Paine Hall at Harvard University.

In 2007, the group won a Grammy Award in the Grammy Award for Best Instrumental Soloist(s) Performance (with orchestra) category, for its recording of Olivier Messiaen's Oiseaux exotiques conducted by John McLaughlin Williams with pianist Angelin Chang.

The  music director is Steven Smith, who has held the position since 2005.

While the orchestra was first formed at Cleveland State University, it has since moved to Cleveland Music School Settlement.

Young and Emerging Composers Concert
Each spring, the Cleveland Chamber Symphony holds their Young and Emerging Composers Concert, a performance featuring music created exclusively by student composers, selected through a competitive process. This concert, a staple of the chamber symphony's programming since its founding in 1980, represents the longstanding tradition of collegiality, apprenticeship, and collaboration at the CCS. Through rehearsals, the performance, and interaction with highly trained professional musicians, the program offers student composers a rich interactive environment within which they can create, experiment with, and refine their music.

Select recordings
Sound Encounters I
(GM 2039 )
 Libby Larsen:  What the Monster Saw
 Salvatore Martirano:  LON/dons - Howie Smith, saxophone
 Bernard Rands:  London Serenade
 Roger Reynolds:  The Dream of the Infinite Rooms - Regina Mushabac, cello

The New American Scene
(Albany Records, Troy 298)
 Ronald Perera:  Music for Flute and Orchestra - William Wittig, flute
 Howie Smith:  Songs for the Children - Howie Smith, wind controller/alto saxophone
 Edwin London:  una novella della sera primavera - Harry Sargous, oboe
 John Eaton:  Songs of Desperation & Comfort - Nelda Nelson, mezzo-soprano

Cleveland Chamber Symphony Vol 6
(TNC CD 1515)
 Danceanu: Chinonic, Op. 67
 Messiaen: Oiseaux Exotiques (Exotic Birds) - Angelin Chang - piano
 Ligeti: Chamber Concerto for 13 Instrumentalists
 Shostakovich: Concerto no. 1 for Piano and Orchestra, Op. 35 - Angelin Chang, piano

The recording of Oiseaux Exotiques by Olivier Messiaen has been awarded a 2007 Grammy Award in the category of Classical Music: Best Instrumental Solo with Orchestra

See also
CityMusic Cleveland
Cleveland Orchestra
Cleveland Philharmonic
Cleveland Women's Orchestra

References

External links
 
 NEOSonicFest
 
 
 
 
 Interview with Edwin London by Bruce Duffie, January 29, 1989

Chamber orchestras
Contemporary classical music ensembles
Musical groups established in 1980
Musical groups from Cleveland
1980 establishments in Ohio
Orchestras based in Ohio
Albany Records artists